Celaenorrhinus aspersa, commonly known as the large streaked flat, is a species of hesperiid butterfly which is found in the Indomalayan realm.

Range
The butterfly occurs in India, north Myanmar, north Thailand, Hainan and western China. In India, the butterfly ranges from Assam eastwards to Nagaland and on to Myanmar.

Status
Very rare.

Cited references

See also
Hesperiidae
List of butterflies of India (Pyrginae)
List of butterflies of India (Hesperiidae)

References

Print

Online

aspersa
Butterflies of Asia
Butterflies of Indochina